Sonata Tamošaitytė (born 28 June 1987 in Kaunas) is a Lithuanian athlete.

She competed in 2009 World Championships in Athletics and reached 31st place in the 100 m hurdles. She also competed in 2009 European Athletics U23 Championships in Kaunas where she finished fifth in the 100 m hurdles and won bronze in the 4 × 100 m relay. At the Universiade in 2008 she finished 21st in the 100 m hurdles and sixth in the 4 × 100 m relay; in 2009 she won silver in the 100 m hurdles and also finished fifth in 4 × 100 m relay.

Competition record

References 
 

1987 births
Living people
Sportspeople from Kaunas
Lithuanian female sprinters
Lithuanian female hurdlers
Athletes (track and field) at the 2012 Summer Olympics
Olympic athletes of Lithuania
Universiade medalists in athletics (track and field)
Universiade silver medalists for Lithuania
Competitors at the 2007 Summer Universiade
Competitors at the 2011 Summer Universiade
Competitors at the 2013 Summer Universiade
Competitors at the 2015 Summer Universiade
Medalists at the 2009 Summer Universiade